Vladislav Nelyubin (born 8 November 1947) is a former Soviet cyclist. He competed in the individual road race at the 1968 Summer Olympics.

References

External links
 

1947 births
Living people
Kyrgyzstani male cyclists
Soviet male cyclists
Olympic cyclists of the Soviet Union
Cyclists at the 1968 Summer Olympics
Sportspeople from Bishkek